Rhyzodiastes ininius is a species of ground beetle in the subfamily Rhysodinae. It was described by R.T. Bell and J.R. Bell in 2009. It is known from French Guiana. Its specific name refers to Inini, the interior of French Guiana.

Rhyzodiastes ininius measure  in length.

References

Rhyzodiastes
Beetles of South America
Endemic fauna of French Guiana
Beetles described in 2009